Fish are very diverse animals and can be categorised in many ways. This article is an overview of some of ways in which fish are categorised. Although most fish species have probably been discovered and described, about 250 new ones are still discovered every year. According to FishBase about 34,800 species of fish had been described as of February 2022, which is more than the combined total of all other vertebrate species: mammals, amphibians, reptiles and birds.

Fish species diversity is roughly divided equally between marine (oceanic) and freshwater ecosystems. Coral reefs in the Indo-Pacific constitute the centre of diversity for marine fishes, whereas continental freshwater fishes are most diverse in large river basins of tropical rainforests, especially the Amazon, Congo, and Mekong basins. More than 5,600 fish species inhabit Neotropical freshwaters alone, such that Neotropical fishes represent about 10% of all vertebrate species on the Earth. Exceptionally rich sites in the Amazon basin, such as Cantão State Park, can contain more freshwater fish species than occur in all of Europe.

By taxonomy

Fish systematics is the formal description and organisation of fish taxa into systems. It is complex and still evolving. Controversies over "arcane, but important, details of classification are still quietly raging".

The term "fish" describes any non-tetrapod chordate, (i.e., an animal with a backbone), that has gills throughout life and has limbs, if any, in the shape of fins. Unlike groupings such as birds or mammals, fish are not a single clade but a paraphyletic collection of taxa, including jawless, cartilaginous and skeletal types.

Jawless fish
Jawless fish were the earliest fish to evolve. There is current debate over whether these are really fish at all. They have no jaw, no scales, no paired fins, and no bony skeleton. Their skin is smooth and soft to the touch, and they are very flexible. Instead of a jaw, they possess an oral sucker. They use this to fasten onto other fish, and then use their rasp-like teeth to grind through their host's skin into the viscera. Jawless fish inhabit both fresh and salt water environments. Some are anadromous, moving between both fresh and salt water habitats.

Extant jawless fish are either lamprey or hagfish. Juvenile lamprey feed by sucking up mud containing micro-organisms and organic debris. The lamprey has well-developed eyes, while the hagfish has only primitive eyespots. The hagfish coats itself and carcasses it finds with noxious slime to deter predators, and periodically ties itself into a knot to scrape the slime off. It is the only invertebrate fish and the only animal which has a skull but no vertebral column.

Cartilaginous fish
Cartilaginous fish have a cartilaginous skeleton. However, their ancestors were bony animals, and were the first fish to develop paired fins. Cartilaginous fish don't have swim bladders. Their skin is covered in placoid scales (dermal denticles) that are as rough as sandpaper. Because cartilaginous fish do not have bone marrow, the spleen and special tissue around the gonads produces red blood cells. Their tails can be asymmetric, with the upper lobe longer than the lower lobe. Some cartilaginous fishes possess an organ called a Leydig's organ which also produces red blood cells.

There are over 980 species of cartilaginous fish. They include sharks, rays and chimaera.

Bony fish
Bony fish include the lobe-finned fish and the ray finned fish. The lobe-finned fish is the class of fleshy finned fishes, consisting of lungfish and coelacanths. They are bony fish with fleshy, lobed paired fins, which are joined to the body by a single bone. These fins evolved into the legs of the first tetrapod land vertebrates, amphibians. Ray finned fishes are so-called because they possess lepidotrichia or "fin rays", their fins being webs of skin supported by bony or horny spines ("rays").

There are three types of ray finned fishes: the chondrosteans, holosteans, and teleosts. The chondrosteans and holosteans are among the earlier fish to evolve, and share characteristics with both teleosts and sharks. In comparison with the other chondrosteans, the holosteans are closer to the teleosts and further from sharks.

Teleosts
Teleosts are the most advanced or "modern" fishes. They are overwhelmingly the dominant class of fishes (or for that matter, vertebrates) with nearly 30,000 species, covering about 96 percent of all extant fish species. They are ubiquitous throughout fresh water and marine environments from the deep sea to the highest mountain streams. Included are nearly all the important commercial and recreational fishes.

Teleosts have a movable maxilla and premaxilla and corresponding modifications in the jaw musculature. These modifications make it possible for teleosts to protrude their jaws outwards from the mouth. The caudal fin is homocercal, meaning the upper and lower lobes are about equal in size. The spine ends at the caudal peduncle, distinguishing this group from those in which the spine extends into the upper lobe of the caudal fin.

By habitat

Fish can also be demersal or pelagic. Demersal fish live on or near the bottom of oceans and lakes, while pelagic fish inhabit the water column away from the bottom. Habitats can also be vertically stratified.

Most oceanic species (78 percent, or 44 percent of all fish species), live near the shoreline. These coastal fish live on or above the relatively shallow continental shelf. Only 13 percent of all fish species live in the open ocean, off the shelf. Of these, 1 percent are epipelagic, 5 percent are pelagic, and 7 percent are deep water.

Fish are found in nearly all natural aquatic environments. Most fish, whether by species count or abundance, live in warmer environments with relatively stable temperatures. Some fish species tolerate salinities over 10 percent. 
|}

By life span
Some of the shortest-lived species are gobies, which are small coral reef–dwelling fish. Some of the longest-lived are rockfish.

By size

By breeding behavior

By brooding behavior

By feeding behaviour

By vision

By shape
Boxfishes have heavily armoured plate-like scales fused into a solid, triangular, boxlike carapace, from which the fins, tail, eyes and mouth protrude. Because of this heavy armour, boxfish move slowly, but few other fish are able to eat the adults.

By locomotion

By toxicity

By human use

By vulnerability
 resilience

Other

See also
 Diversity of gastropods
 Largest organisms
 List of long-living organisms
 Maximum life span
 Smallest organisms

Notes

References
  
 
 
 Weis, Judith S (2011) Do Fish Sleep?: Fascinating Answers to Questions about Fishes Rutgers University Press. .

External links
 Articles About Marine Life Oceans for Youth Foundation.
 The 20 weirdest fish in the ocean Christian Science Monitor. 22 February 22, 2010.

Ichthyology